This is a list of cities in Senegal organised by population.  It includes all cities with an estimated population of over 10,000 people.

Cities

Other settlements

References

External links

 
Senegal, List of cities in
Cities
Senegal